Jericho is an American television drama series produced by Carol Barbee, Jon Turteltaub, Dan Shotz, Jonathan Steinberg, Josh Schaer, and Stephen Chbosky. The series is set in the fictional town of Jericho, Kansas in the aftermath of the simultaneous nuclear attacks on 23 American cities. Significant story arcs in the first season are the immediate aftermath of detonation of the bombs, the resulting isolation of the town, and confrontations between family, friends, bandits, and neighboring towns. The second season focuses on the arrival of a new federal government, the imposition of a police state, and Jake Green's (Skeet Ulrich) and Robert Hawkins' (Lennie James) attempt to expose the masterminds behind the attack.

Jericho originally aired from September 20, 2006 to March 25, 2008 on CBS in the United States. For the first season, 22 episodes were ordered and separated into two runs of 11 episodes each. The series went on hiatus after the "fall finale" episode of November 29, 2006, and returned with a recap episode on February 14, 2007. The remaining 11 episodes of the first season were then broadcast from February 21, 2007 to May 9, 2007. Because of lackluster results during the latter half of the first season, the show was not renewed. After a large fan outcry CBS ordered seven additional episodes for a trial second season, which began airing on February 12, 2008 and ended on March 25, 2008. Though the second season received favorable reviews, it was ultimately canceled.

Seasons one and two of Jericho have been released on DVD for Regions 1, 2, and 4 and a "Complete Series" DVD has been released for Region 1 and 2. Episodes of Jericho are also available in various new media formats. iTunes, Amazon Unbox and Netflix sell the episodes, and CBS streams the episodes for free on its website. The series did exceptionally well online, which was a complicating factor in deciding to cancel the series.

Series overview

Episodes

Season 1 (2006–07)

Season 2 (2008)

Special (2007)

Comic series continuations

Season 3 (comics)

Season 4 (comics)
A fourth season was also released in comic book format.

Notes
1, 2. The sounds heard as the intertitle is shown are International Morse Code episode-specific messages.
3. In the original ending, Hawkins acts as a diversion at the airport to buy Jake more time. A third season would have focused on rescuing Hawkins and on "John Smith".
4. After the episode ends, a war begins.

References

External links
 

Lists of American drama television series episodes